Jason and the Argonauts are characters from Greek mythology. This title may also refer to:
 
 Jason and the Argonauts (1963 film), a 1963 film directed by Don Chaffey with animation by Ray Harryhausen
 Jason and the Argonauts (miniseries), a two-part TV movie made in 2000
 "Jason and the Argonauts", a song by British pop group XTC on the 1982 album English Settlement